is a 1982 Japanese–American documentary and mondo film directed by Sheldon Renan and Leonard Schrader. The film was premiered in New York City in February 1982 and was shown at the 2013 Fantasia Festival.

Synopsis
The Killing of America focuses on what the director feels is the decline of the United States. It features interviews from Ed Dorris, a retired sergeant of the Los Angeles Sheriff's Department, as well as Los Angeles County Coroner Thomas Noguchi. The documentary also shows several interviews with convicted killers such as Sirhan Sirhan as well as footage of murders and news broadcasts. It connects the beginning of America's woes with the assassination of John F. Kennedy and posits that hope of recovery was snuffed out when Robert F. Kennedy was assassinated in 1968 (the film features footage from the Zapruder film and news footage from the night that Robert Kennedy was killed). According to the film the 1960s saw the rise of "sniper" mass murderers who were often white, well-adjusted people that killed people seemingly at random (exemplified in the film by the murders of Charles Whitman). The 1970s saw the rise of what the film calls "sex killers", serial killers such as Ted Bundy and John Wayne Gacy who also raped and sexually abused their victims. A section of the film also analyses the Cleveland Elementary School shooting in 1979, in which a 16-year-old teenager opened fire on a group of children and staff from her window opposite an elementary school in San Diego, injuring 9 people and killing the school's principal and a janitor.

The last part of the film goes over the murder of John Lennon and ends with footage from a Central Park vigil for the slain musician. The narrators' last lines are: "Two people were shot at this Central Park vigil. While you watched this movie, five more of us were murdered; one was the random killing of a stranger."

Cast
Chuck Riley as Narrator
Ed Dorris
Thomas Noguchi
Sirhan Sirhan
Elmer Wayne Henley
Edmund Kemper

Release history
The Killing of America was initially released in Japan in September 1981. It made its United States debut in New York City in February 1982 at The Public Theater but did not receive a commercial release in the United States. It did receive a home video release in Britain. The film received a wide release in Japan, where financial backers reportedly pressured Renan to add footage of peace vigils for John Lennon as a way to make the documentary less depressing.

Years later the documentary would receive a 2013 North American release at Fantasia Festival in Canada.

The Killing of America was released on DVD in February 2002 and re-released in October 2016 on Blu-ray.

Reception
Critical reception for The Killing of America has been mixed. Allmovie gave the film 2 1/2 stars out of 5, remarking that "Rather than an in-depth study of the reasons for and effects of the rising murder rate in the U.S., the director has chosen to emphasize the violence and the need for gun control to help lower the appalling amount of mayhem that distinguishes the U.S. from its European counterparts." In contrast, in the book The Horror Film Mikita Brottman considered the film to be "one of the more thoughtful and fascinating examples of the mondo genre".

See also
Bowling for Columbine
List of films of 1982
Taxi Driver – 1976 film written by Paul Schrader

References

External links

Trailer

1982 films
1982 documentary films
American documentary films
American independent films
Documentary films about American politics
1982 independent films
Mondo films
Works about gun politics in the United States
Documentary films about crime in the United States
1980s English-language films
1980s American films